In Volks NO v Robinson and Others, an important case in South African family and succession law, a Mrs. Robinson had been in a permanent life partnership with one Mr. Shandling. They had lived together as husband and wife from 1985 until Mr Shandling's death in 2001. Mr. Shandling had supported Mrs. Robinson. When. Mr Shandling died— Volks was his executor— he left Mrs. Robinson a small legacy, but Mrs. Robinson sued additionally for maintenance.

Robinson's claim was rejected because she did not fall within the definition of a “spouse” in the Maintenance of Surviving Spouses Act 27 of 1990. On appeal to the High Court, the court held that the Act was unfairly discriminatory on the grounds of equality and dignity.

On appeal to the Constitutional Court, the court held that the purpose of the Act was to provide for the maintenance of the surviving spouse, and that the ultimate aim was to extend an invariable consequence of marriage (i.e., support) beyond the death of either of the parties. The court further held that the Act was incapable of an interpretation including permanent life partners in the definition of a “spouse,” as marriage is an important social institution, and the law is allowed to distinguish between married and unmarried persons and accord benefits to the married.

The court held, accordingly, that there was a differentiation in the Act, but that it did not amount to an infringement of the right to equality. This decision was based on the fact that, during a marriage, the parties have a reciprocal duty of support, but there is no such duty accorded to the unmarried. The aim of the legislation was not to encompass the unmarried. Accordingly, the court could not require the imposition of an obligation on a deceased person's estate where there is no such obligation on the deceased when he is alive.

References 
 Volks NO v Robinson and Others 2005 (5) BCLR 446 (CC).

Notes 

South African case law
2005 in case law
2005 in South African law